VREF or vref may stand for:

Vancomycin-resistant Enterococcus faecium, an antibiotic-resistant microorganism
VREF speed, the reference landing approach speed of an aircraft; see 
Voltage reference, an electronic device that ideally produces a fixed (constant) voltage irrespective of other factors
Volvo Research and Educational Foundations, a group of four foundations headed by Jose Holguin-Veras